Michael J. Capanegro (May 17, 1927 – March 17, 2004) was an American politician who served in the New York State Assembly from Queens's 8th district from 1961 to 1965.

He died on March 17, 2004, in Lloyd Harbor, New York at age 76.

References

1927 births
2004 deaths
Democratic Party members of the New York State Assembly
20th-century American politicians